Auriculinella  is a genus of small air-breathing land snails, terrestrial pulmonate gastropod mollusks in the family Ellobiidae.

This is a monotypic genus.

Species
The only species within the genus Leucophytia is:
 Leucophytia bidentata (Montagu, 1808) - type species

References

 Vaught, K.C. (1989). A classification of the living Mollusca. American Malacologists: Melbourne, FL (USA). . XII, 195 pp.
 Gofas, S.; Le Renard, J.; Bouchet, P. (2001). Mollusca, in: Costello, M.J. et al. (Ed.) (2001). European register of marine species: a check-list of the marine species in Europe and a bibliography of guides to their identification. Collection Patrimoines Naturels, 50: pp. 180–213

External links
 Photo of live animal

Ellobiidae